Sergio Santamaría González (born 16 July 1980) is a Spanish former professional footballer who played as an attacking midfielder.

Club career
Santamaría was born in Málaga, Andalusia. At age 12, after scoring 52 goals for local La Cala del Moral, he moved to neighbours Málaga CF to continue his grooming, and joined country giants CF Real Madrid after four years.

In 1998–99, the Catalan's director of football, Lorenzo Serra Ferrer, promoted Santamaría to the club's B-team, which also included Luis García, Carles Puyol and Xavi. In the following seasons, he switched back and forth between the B and the C-sides, as both squads operated in 4–3–3, and the player scored 11 goals; on 19 May 2000, he made his first-team – and La Liga – debut, playing 45 minutes against Celta de Vigo in the last matchday.

After the following campaign, in which he played exclusively for the reserves, Santamaría begun a series of loans until his June 2005 final release, all in the second division. In between, he also appeared four times for Barça in the season in which he was not loaned.

In the summer of 2005, Santamaría moved to Albacete Balompié also in the second level. Subsequently, he dropped down to division three, with UE Sant Andreu and CD Logroñés; he had a solid individual season with the latter club, but it was nonetheless relegated due to economic issues.

Santamaría resumed his career in the fourth tier, respectively with UD Alzira, Antequera CF and Alhaurín de la Torre CF (the latter two in his native region). He retired in June 2011 at the age of 31, due to injury.

International career
As he was part of Barcelona B's setup, Santamaría was called to represent Spain at the 1997 FIFA U-17 World Championship in Egypt. He was the recipient of the tournament's Golden Ball over the likes of Ronaldinho, Gabriel Milito and Sebastian Deisler, in an eventual third-place finish.

References

External links

1980 births
Living people
Footballers from Málaga
Spanish footballers
Association football midfielders
Spain youth international footballers
Spain under-21 international footballers
La Liga players
Segunda División players
Segunda División B players
Tercera División players
FC Barcelona C players
FC Barcelona Atlètic players
FC Barcelona players
Real Oviedo players
Elche CF players
Deportivo Alavés players
Albacete Balompié players
UE Sant Andreu footballers
CD Logroñés footballers
UD Alzira footballers
Antequera CF footballers